Weko is a community in the Democratic Republic of the Congo.

Populated places in Tshopo